Facelina annulata is a species of sea slug, an aeolid nudibranch, a marine gastropod mollusc in the family Facelinidae.

Distribution
This species was described from a specimen found on the shore one mile SW of the mouth of the Kowie River, Port Alfred, Eastern Cape, South Africa.

References

Facelinidae
Gastropods described in 1954